Biloozerskyi National Nature Park is a protected area in Ukraine. It is shared between Boryspil Raion of Kyiv Oblast and Cherkasy Raion of Cherkasy Oblast. The park was created on 11 December 2009.

References

National parks of Ukraine
Geography of Cherkasy Oblast
Geography of Kyiv Oblast